Plume is a publishing company in the United States, founded in 1970 as the trade paperback imprint of New American Library. Today it is a division of Penguin Group, with a backlist of approximately 700 titles.

References

External links
 Plume - Penguin Books USA

Pearson plc
Book publishing companies based in New York (state)
Publishing companies established in 1970